James van Rensburg (28 June 1924 – 29 February 1996) was a South African weightlifter. He competed in the men's featherweight event at the 1952 Summer Olympics.

References

1924 births
1996 deaths
South African male weightlifters
Olympic weightlifters of South Africa
Weightlifters at the 1952 Summer Olympics
Sportspeople from Kimberley, Northern Cape